The 2007 DFL-Ligapokal was the 11th and final edition of the DFL-Ligapokal. The competition could not be scheduled in 2008, due to fixture congestion caused by UEFA Euro 2008, and did not return in 2009. An unofficial Super Cup ran in these years, and was made official in 2010, as the DFL-Supercup.

The 2007 Ligapokal saw a minor format change, with the 2. Bundesliga champions (in this case, Karlsruher SC) entering in place of the fifth-placed Bundesliga team. The title was won by Bayern Munich, who secured their sixth win with a 1–0 victory over Schalke 04.

Participating clubs
A total of six teams qualified for the competition. The labels in the parentheses show how each team qualified for the place of its starting round:
1st, 2nd, 3rd, 4th, etc.: League position
CW: Cup winners
2BL: 2. Bundesliga champions
TH: Title holders

Matches

Preliminary round

Semi-finals

Final

References

DFL-Ligapokal seasons
Ligapokal